Joel Patrick Skinner (born February 21, 1961) is an American professional baseball manager and coach, and former Major League catcher and manager. Skinner mostly has managed at the minor-league level, save for one half of one season at the helm of the  Cleveland Indians. He is the son of Bob Skinner, a National League outfielder in the 1950s and 1960s, and himself a former MLB coach and skipper.

In , Skinner became the manager of the Rochester Red Wings, the Triple-A affiliate of the Minnesota Twins.  He was replaced by Toby Gardenhire for the 2020 season.

High school career
At Mission Bay High School in San Diego, Joel Skinner, along with Matt Britt, played baseball and water polo.  He was drafted immediately following his senior year  and was the first player taken in the free-agent compensation draft.

Major league playing career
Originally drafted by the Pittsburgh Pirates, Skinner was traded to the Chicago White Sox in 1983.  After brief call-ups to the majors over the next three years, Skinner was slated to start 1986 with the White Sox.

New general manager Hawk Harrelson had taken a liking to Skinner, and decided to make him the starting catcher in place of Carlton Fisk.  This made some sense on paper; Fisk was 38 years old, and conventional wisdom then as now held that catchers at that age don't have many years left.  Harrelson wanted to have Fisk's successor in place when Fisk retired.  To ease the transition, Fisk was moved to left field.  The move backfired when Skinner batted only .171 in April.  On May 10, Fisk became the regular catcher, and Skinner only made 25 more starts behind the plate before being traded to the New York Yankees on July 30.

Skinner's career never really recovered after that.  He bounced between the majors and minors with the Yankees and Cleveland Indians until his retirement in 1994.

Minor league managing career
Skinner spent six seasons managing in the Indians minor league system from 1995–2000. Overall, he compiled a record of 448–333 (.574) and took his teams to the playoffs in five of six seasons. In 1995 Skinner managed the Watertown Indians to a record of 46- 27 and a New York–Penn League title, and received Manager of the Year honors. With the Columbus Redstixx (South Atlantic League) in 1996, he managed them to a second half title and a regular season record of 79–63. In 1997, Skinner managed the Class A Kinston Indians (Carolina League) as they won titles in both the first and second halves with an 87–53 record overall, earning him Carolina League Manager of the Year honors. From 1998 through 1999 Skinner managed the Akron Aeros  and was named USA Today Baseball Weekly's Minor League Manager of the Year in 1998, after guiding the Aeros to an 81–60 record and an Eastern League regular season title. Skinner then managed the Triple-A Buffalo Bisons to the best record in the International League in 2000, including an IL North Division title with a record of 86–59 (.593). His leadership of the Bisons in earned him Minor League Manager of the Year honors from Baseball America and The Sporting News in addition to being given International League Manager of the Year honors. That same season Skinner was a coach for Team USA in the 2000 All-Star Futures Game in Atlanta.

In 2011 Skinner was hired as the manager of the Charlotte Knights, the White Sox Triple-A affiliate, for the 2012 season.

In 2016, Skinner was the manager of the Winston-Salem Dash of the Carolina League.

On January 17, 2018, Skinner was named as the 45th manager of the International League's Rochester Red Wings, the Triple-A affiliate of the Minnesota Twins. His contract was not renewed for the 2020 season and he was replaced by Toby Gardenhire.

Major League managing/coaching career
Skinner was named to the coaching staff of the Cleveland Indians on November 10, 2000, succeeding Jim Riggleman as third base coach.  He was named interim manager of the Tribe on July 11, 2002 after Charlie Manuel was let go in a contract dispute.   At the time, Skinner was the youngest manager in the major leagues, at age 41.  He skippered the team to a 35–41 record to finish the season, including a 15–13 record in September.  Skinner's name was mentioned among candidates to the permanent manager's job, but Eric Wedge was chosen instead.  Skinner remained on the Indians' coaching staff until Manny Acta was hired in 2009.  On October 20, 2010, Skinner was hired as the Oakland Athletics bench coach for the 2011 season replacing Tye Waller. On November 14, 2011, Skinner was hired as the manager of the Charlotte Knights.

Managerial records

Career statistics

See also
 List of second-generation Major League Baseball players

References

External links

 MLB.com Bio

1961 births
Living people
Baseball players from California
Buffalo Bisons (minor league) managers
Buffalo Bisons (minor league) players
Canton-Akron Indians players
Charlotte Knights players
Chicago White Sox players
Cleveland Indians coaches
Cleveland Indians managers
Cleveland Indians players
Columbus Clippers players
Denver Bears players
Denver Zephyrs players
Glens Falls White Sox players
Greenwood Pirates players
Major League Baseball bench coaches
Major League Baseball catchers
Major League Baseball third base coaches
New York Yankees players
People from La Jolla, San Diego
Rochester Red Wings managers
Shelby Pirates players